Emma Formas de Dávila (born 1883) was a Chilean artist. She was born in Santiago and was educated at the Sacred Hearts' School. She was interested in art from her early youth, and in 1910, her desire to paint led her to enter the School of Fine Arts, where she studied under Fernando Álvarez de Sotomayor y Zaragoza and developed marked talent in portraiture. Her paintings won commendation from competent critics and were awarded prizes in several exhibitions: in the Exposition of 1910, she was given third prize; in 1915, second prize, and in 1919, a like honor for the portrait of her husband, Ricardo Davila Silva.

References

1883 births
Year of death missing
20th-century Chilean women artists
Artists from Santiago
Portrait artists